Bryotropha domestica is a moth of the family Gelechiidae. It is found from Ireland to Germany, Slovakia, Romania and Bulgaria and from the Benelux to the Iberian Peninsula, Sicily, Crete and Cyprus. It is also found in Morocco, Algeria, Tunisia, Libya, the Middle East, Turkmenistan, Saudi Arabia and Yemen.

The wingspan is 12–13 mm. The forewings are dark greyish brown, heavily mottled with pale ochreous. The hindwings are very pale glossy grey, but darker towards the apex. Adults are on wing from mid-May to early August in one generation per year.

The larvae feed on various mosses growing on walls. They feed from within a silken gallery. Pupation takes place within an open network cocoon in this gallery. The larvae have a reddish-brown body.

References

Moths described in 1828
domestica
Moths of Europe
Moths of Africa
Moths of Asia